The 2014 Stanley Cup Finals was the championship series of the National Hockey League's (NHL)  season, and the culmination of the 2014 Stanley Cup playoffs. The League realigned its divisions prior to the season, and changed the structure of the playoffs, but the championship series remained the same. The Western Conference champion Los Angeles Kings defeated the Eastern Conference champion New York Rangers four games to one to win their second championship in franchise history, marking the first time since 2007 that the championship series was determined in fewer than six games. Their Stanley Cup–winning run of 26 playoff games was later tied by the 2019 St. Louis Blues for the longest of any Stanley Cup–winning team in history.

Los Angeles had home ice advantage in the series, as the Kings finished with a better regular season record than the Rangers. The series started on June 4 and ended on June 13 with the Kings winning their second Stanley Cup in three seasons. It was the first meeting between teams from New York City and Los Angeles for a major professional sports championship since the Yankees and the Dodgers played in the 1981 World Series. Coincidentally, 1981 was also the last time the Rangers and the Kings had met in the postseason; that was the last season where the league did not use a geographical based playoff format and as a result any two teams could meet in any round of the postseason regardless of geography. In 1981 the Rangers eliminated the Kings during the first round of the playoffs.

Paths to the Finals

New York Rangers

This was New York's 11th appearance in the Stanley Cup Finals, and they were seeking their fifth Cup championship overall and their first one since , 20 years earlier. Since their win in 1994, their only other post-season highlights were reaching the Conference Finals in 1997 and 2012.

The Rangers entered the season after essentially swapping head coaches with the Vancouver Canucks: the Rangers and the Canucks fired John Tortorella and Alain Vigneault, respectively, and then coincidentally hired the other's former coach. While Vancouver, under Tortorella's first year, failed to make the playoffs, Vigneault guided New York to 96 regular season points and second place in the new Metropolitan Division. En route, the Rangers made a major trade with the Tampa Bay Lightning on March 5, acquiring Tampa Bay's captain Martin St. Louis in exchange for their own captain Ryan Callahan. The transaction happened as Callahan and the Rangers were not close to terms on a new contract, while St. Louis was unhappy at his initial omission from the Olympics by Steve Yzerman (general manager of both the Lightning and Team Canada).

In the first round of the playoffs, the Rangers eliminated the Philadelphia Flyers in seven games. Then, in the second round against the Pittsburgh Penguins, New York overcame a 3–1 game deficit to win the series. In the Eastern Conference Finals, the Rangers defeated the Montreal Canadiens in six games to capture their first Eastern Conference championship in 20 years. In the process, the Rangers became the first team ever to play two full seven-game series in the first two rounds of the playoffs and reach the Stanley Cup Finals, a feat later matched and exceeded in the same postseason by the Kings.

Due to trading away captain Ryan Callahan and not naming a successor for the remainder of the season, Rangers were the first team since the 1972–73 Chicago Black Hawks to advance to the Stanley Cup Finals without a captain.

By reaching the Finals with the Rangers, Mats Zuccarello made history when he became the first Norwegian to play in the Stanley Cup Finals.

Los Angeles Kings

Much of the core from the Kings' 2012 championship remained on the team. Los Angeles made a late regular season trade on March 5, acquiring former Ranger Marian Gaborik from the Columbus Blue Jackets in exchange for Matt Frattin and two draft picks. The Kings then finished the regular season in third place in the Pacific Division with 100 points.

The Finals were the only series in the 2014 playoffs in which the Kings had home ice advantage. Los Angeles needed three consecutive game sevens to advance to the Cup Finals (breaking the aforementioned Rangers' game sevens record just a couple of days later), winning all of them on the road. The team became the fourth team in NHL playoff history to win a seven-game series after losing the first three games, defeating the San Jose Sharks in the first round. The Kings eliminated their local rival Anaheim Ducks next, despite squandering a 2–0 series lead and then facing a 3–2 series deficit. In a rematch of the 2013 Western Conference Final, the Kings defeated the defending Stanley Cup champion Chicago Blackhawks in the Western Conference Final who had forced a seventh game after trailing the series 3–1.

Like their 2012 championship series, the Kings' 2014 Cup Finals was marked by a 3–0 series start of winning the first two games in overtime and the third as a shutout. With their 2014 Stanley Cup win, the Kings have the distinction of winning the first championship after the League's realignment. Their 2012 championship made them also the final team to win the Cup in the League's last full season before the realignment, as the 2012–13 season was shortened by a lockout. The Kings played a record 26 playoff games to win the Stanley Cup, the most ever for a champion (the St. Louis Blues matched this feat in 2019).

Game summaries
 Number in parenthesis represents the player's total in goals or assists to that point of the entire four rounds of the playoffs

Game one

The Kings overcame a two-goal deficit to defeat the Rangers 3–2 in the first game. New York built their 2–0 lead in the first period by scoring 1:42 apart. Benoit Pouliot scored first on a breakaway after stealing the puck from Drew Doughty, then shooting past Jonathan Quick. Carl Hagelin then recorded a short-handed goal, as his shot was initially blocked by Quick but then rebounded off of Slava Voynov's skate into the net. The Kings' comeback began with Kyle Clifford's goal late in the first period. Clifford shot it in from near the left post after receiving a pass from Jeff Carter. Doughty tied the game in the second period, beating Henrik Lundqvist from the left circle. In the third period, the Kings outshot the Rangers, 20–3, but neither Lundqvist nor Quick allowed any goals. In the final minute of regulation, Quick stopped Hagelin's shot on a breakaway, and seconds later Lundqvist barely kept Carter's wrap-around shot from crossing the goal line. In overtime, Daniel Girardi turned over the puck in the New York zone, leading Mike Richards to pass the puck to Justin Williams, who then put the puck over Lundqvist to win the game.

Game two

The Kings overcame three two-goal deficits to defeat the Rangers 5–4 in double overtime. Including their game seven victory in the Western Conference Final against the Chicago Blackhawks, Los Angeles became the first team in Stanley Cup playoffs history to overcome three consecutive two-goal deficits. With the first game also going to overtime, it marked the third consecutive year that the first two games of the Stanley Cup Finals went to overtime. Ryan McDonagh and Mats Zuccarello scored in the first period to give the Rangers a 2–0 lead. Jarret Stoll then cut New York's lead in half at 1:46 of the second period. The teams then traded power play goals with Martin St. Louis scoring for the Rangers and Willie Mitchell for the Kings. Eleven seconds after Mitchell's goal, Derick Brassard gave New York a 4–2 lead after miscommunication between Mitchell and Jonathan Quick behind the Kings net lead to a turnover. Dwight King's goal to cut the Rangers' lead to 4–3 early in the third period was controversial. King and McDonagh were fighting for position in front of Henrik Lundqvist when Matt Greene shot the puck from the right point. King made contact with Lundqvist in the crease as he touched the puck before it went into the net but no goaltender interference was called: the referee ruled that the contact occurred after the puck already sailed past Lundqvist. Marian Gaborik then tied the game with an unassisted goal at 7:36 of the third during a scramble in front of the New York net. At 10:26 of double overtime, Dustin Brown deflected Mitchell's shot from the left point into the net to give the Kings the 5–4 win. This gave the Kings a 2–0 series lead as the series shifted to New York City, despite never leading in either game during regulation time in Los Angeles.

Game three

This was the first Stanley Cup Finals game played in the state of New York since Game 6 of the 1999 Finals in Buffalo. The Kings won 3–0, led by the goaltending of Jonathan Quick, who shut out the Rangers on 32 shots. The first period was marked by tight checking, and only nine shots were recorded by the two teams. Mats Zuccarello nearly scored for the Rangers at 12:37 of the first, but his shot went off the post and Quick's stick to stay out. With one second to play, Jeff Carter's shot from the slot deflected off a Rangers defenceman past Henrik Lundqvist to put the Kings ahead by one. In the second period, Jake Muzzin scored from the point on another deflection off a Rangers player. Mike Richards scored later in the period, on a two-on-one, his attempted pass deflecting off a Rangers player back to him, leaving Lundqvist out of position to make the stop. Meanwhile, Quick stopped all 17 shots the Rangers put on the net in the second, including a stick save on Derick Brassard when he appeared to be well out of position to make the save. There was no scoring in the third and the Kings took a three games to none series lead, putting the Rangers on the brink of elimination.

Game four

The Rangers avoided becoming the first team since 1998 to get swept in the Finals by defeating the Kings 2–1. In a turn-around from game three, the Kings outshot the Rangers and lost as Rangers netminder Henrik Lundqvist saved 40 out of 41 shots. Like games one and two, the Rangers scored the first two goals, on goals by Benoit Pouliot and Martin St. Louis. Dustin Brown scored for the Kings in the second period to cut the margin to 2–1. In the third period, the Kings put pressure on the Rangers and nearly tied the score when the puck slid past Lundqvist to rest on the goal line before being cleared away. Earlier, in the first period, another shot by the Kings also rested on the goal line and did not go in. In all, the Kings outshot the Rangers 15–1 in the third, but did not score.

Game five

The Kings clinched their second Stanley Cup in franchise history, their first since 2012, by defeating the Rangers 3–2 on home ice. This was the first Stanley Cup–clinching game since 2010 to be determined in overtime, and the first time that the home team had the overtime Stanley Cup winner since 1980. The Kings played 26 playoff games on their road to the trophy, more than any previous Stanley Cup–winning team.

The Kings grabbed the lead in the first period with an even-strength goal by Justin Williams. In the second, Chris Kreider converted on a Rangers power play before Brian Boyle scored a short-handed goal to put the road team up by one with 30 seconds left. In the third, Marian Gaborik tied the game at two on a Kings power play. No more goals were scored in regulation and the game went to overtime. The first overtime period featured one penalty for the Kings, but the Rangers were unable to score on the ensuing power play. With five minutes to go in the second overtime period and the Kings on a 3-on-2 breakaway, Tyler Toffoli fired a shot that Henrik Lundqvist kicked out directly to Alec Martinez, who fired it into the open net to win both the game and the series for the Kings. At that time, the Kings had outshot the Rangers 51–30. It was the longest game in Kings history until 2018.

Team rosters
Years indicated in boldface under the "Finals appearance" column signify that the player won the Stanley Cup in the given year.

Los Angeles Kings

New York Rangers

Note: ''Brad Richards served as the Rangers unofficial team captain during the 2014 Stanley Cup playoffs. Richards was the alternate captain with the longest tenure in the league on the roster at the time of the playoffs.

Stanley Cup engraving
The 2014 Stanley Cup was presented to Kings captain Dustin Brown by NHL Commissioner Gary Bettman following the Kings 3–2 overtime win over the Rangers in game five.

The following Kings players and staff had their names engraved on the Stanley Cup

2013–14 Los Angeles Kings

Television
This was the last year under the League's current Canadian TV contracts with CBC (English broadcasts of the Finals) and the cable network TSN (English broadcasts), and RDS (French broadcasts). The NHL's twelve-year contract with Rogers Communications would then take effect beginning next season, with English-language national coverage of the Finals being sub-licensed to CBC, and French-language telecasts being sub-licensed to TVA Sports. TSN will only be showing regional games for Toronto, Ottawa and Winnipeg starting the fall of 2014
 
In the United States, NBCSN broadcast games three and four, while NBC televised the remaining games. NBC Sports originally planned to repeat its coverage pattern from the last few seasons: NBCSN would televise game two and three, while NBC would broadcast game one, and then games four to seven. After the League scheduled game two on the day of the 2014 Belmont Stakes, coverage of games two and four were switched so NBC's telecast of the horse race would serve as lead-in programming to game two. Due to the death of a family member, NBC lead play-by-play announcer Mike Emrick missed game one. Kenny Albert, who was also the Rangers radio announcer for WEPN and announced several national games (including the Western Conference Finals) for NBC/NBCSN, filled in for Emrick in the first game.

Quotes

References

External links
 Official Site

2013–14 NHL season
Los Angeles Kings games
New York Rangers games
Stanley Cup Finals
Stanley Cup Finals
Stanley Cup Finals
Stanley Cup Finals
 
Ice hockey competitions in New York City
Ice hockey competitions in Los Angeles
Stanley Cup Finals
2010s in Manhattan
Madison Square Garden